The Arab Socialist Ba'ath Party – Yemen Region ( Ḥizb al-Ba‘th al-‘Arabī al-Ishtirākī - Quṭr al-Yaman) is the Yemeni regional branch of the Arab Socialist Ba'ath Party (based in Damascus).

Ba'athism in Yemen originates back to the 1950s. The party carried out clandestine political activity until 1990. The party was officially registered as the 'Arab Socialist Ba'ath Party' on 31 December 1995, while the pro-Iraq party registered as the 'National Arab Socialist Ba'ath Party' in 1997. The general secretary of the party in Yemen is Mohammed Al-Zubairy.

The party contested the 1993 parliamentary election in alliance with the National Arab Socialist Ba'ath Party, winning seven seats. After the election, however, relations between the two Ba'athist groups soured and they contested further elections separately. In the 1997 and 2003 parliamentary elections, the party won two seats. In 2003, the party received 0.66% of the national vote. The party supported Ali Abdullah Saleh in the 1999 presidential election. In December 2008, the Arab Socialist Ba'ath Party and the National Arab Socialist Ba'ath Party agreed to again coordinate their political activities.

In November 2010 one of the key leaders of the party in Yemen, Ali Ahmad Nasser al-Dhahab, who was assistant general secretary of the Regional Command and Member of Parliament since 1993, died.

In 2011, the party participated in the Yemeni Revolution against President Ali Abdullah Saleh.

On the 5th of January, 2020, they condemned the American drone strike that assassinated Qasem Soleimani and Abu Mahdi al-Muhandis, saying the two were martyred and that the attack threatened international and regional peace.

Electoral history

House of Representatives elections

References

External links
Website of the Arab Socialist Ba'ath Party – Yemen Region
Facebook page of the party

1951 establishments in Asia
Arab nationalism in Yemen
Ba'athist parties
Yemen
Establishments in the Kingdom of Yemen
Formerly banned socialist parties
Organizations of the Arab Spring
Organizations of the Yemeni Crisis (2011–present)
Political parties in Yemen
Socialist parties in Yemen
Yemeni Revolution